Burgo, de Burgo, del Burgo or El Burgo may refer to:

People
 House of Burgh, an Anglo-Norman and Hiberno-Norman dynasty founded in 1193
 De Burgo baronets, a title in the Baronetage of Ireland
 Bill Burgo (1919–1988), American Major League Baseball player in 1943 and 1944
 Dominic de Burgo (1629–1704), Roman Catholic Bishop of Elphin
 Roland de Burgo (died 1589), Roman Catholic and Anglican Bishop of Clonfert
 Thomas Burke (bishop) or Thomas de Burgo (c. 1709–1776), Irish Dominican and Roman Catholic Bishop of Ossory
 Jaime del Burgo (born 1942), Spanish lawyer, politician and historian
 Rufino Segovia del Burgo (born 1985), Spanish footballer
 Burgo Partridge (1935–1963), English author and member of the Bloomsbury Group
 Burgo Fitzgerald, a character in the novel Can You Forgive Her?, by Anthony Trollope

Places
 El Burgo, a village in the province of Málaga in Spain
 Burgo de Osma-Ciudad de Osma,  third-largest municipality in Soria, Castile and León, Spain

Buildings
 Burgo de Osma Cathedral, Roman Catholic church located in El Burgo de Osma, Spain
 Pellicer-De Burgo House, historic house located at 53 St George Street in St Augustine, Florida

Food
 Steak de Burgo, steak dish and regional specialty in the Midwest, Des Moines, Iowa, United States
 Burgo (food), a folded rice pancake, specialty of Palembang, Indonesia

Publications
 Book of the de Burgos or Book of the Burkes, late 16th-century Gaelic illuminated manuscript held by the Library of Trinity College, Dublin

See also
 Burgos (disambiguation)
 de Burgh
 Burke (disambiguation)